Isaka, Ambohimahasoa is a rural commune in the  Central Highlands of Madagascar. It belongs to the district of Ambohimahasoa, which is a part of Haute Matsiatra Region. The population of the commune was estimated to be 11,642 in 2018.

Only primary schooling is available. The majority 98% of the population of the commune are farmers.  The most important crops are rice and potatoes, while other important agricultural products are peanuts and cassava. Services provide employment for 2% of the population.

References and notes 

Populated places in Haute Matsiatra